Ysbyty Alltwen (English: Alltwen Hospital) is a health facility in Tremadog, Gwynedd, Wales. It is managed by the Betsi Cadwaladr University Health Board.

History
The facility was commissioned to replace the aging Ysbyty Bron y Garth in Penrhyndeudraeth. It was designed by IBI Group and built on an elevated site which had previously been occupied by a rail interchange and ironstone mine. It cost £19 million to construct and was officially opened by Edwina Hart, Minister for Health and Social Services, in July 2009.

References

Hospitals in Gwynedd
Hospitals established in 2009
2009 establishments in Wales
Hospital buildings completed in 2009
NHS hospitals in Wales
Betsi Cadwaladr University Health Board